KDST is a country formatted broadcast radio station licensed to Dyersville, Iowa, serving Dubuque and Delaware counties in Iowa.  KDST is owned and operated by Design Homes, Inc.

History
The station was licensed as KDMC on March 21, 1984, changed to KXIX August 10, 1987 and changed again to the current KDST on December 15, 1988.

Transmission
The transmitter and broadcast tower are located six miles southwest of Dyersville, near the intersection of 250th Street and 300th Avenue, in rural Hopkinton in Delaware County.

References

External links
Real Country 99.3 KDST Online

DST
Country radio stations in the United States
Radio stations established in 1984